Paul Charles Naisby (born 18 July 1955) is a British former swimmer.

Career
Naisby competed at the 1972 Summer Olympics and the 1976 Summer Olympics.

He represented England and won two bronze medals in the 100 metres and 200 metres breaststroke events, at the 1974 British Commonwealth Games in Christchurch, New Zealand. Four years later he represented England again and won another bronze medal in the 100 metres breaststroke, at the 1978 Commonwealth Games in Edmonton, Alberta, Canada. He won the ASA National Championship title in the 100 metres breaststroke (1977) and the 1977 title in the 200 metres butterfly.

References

External links
 

1955 births
Living people
British male swimmers
Olympic swimmers of Great Britain
Swimmers at the 1972 Summer Olympics
Swimmers at the 1976 Summer Olympics
Swimmers at the 1974 British Commonwealth Games
Swimmers at the 1978 Commonwealth Games
Commonwealth Games medallists in swimming
Commonwealth Games bronze medallists for England
Sportspeople from Sunderland
British male breaststroke swimmers
Medallists at the 1974 British Commonwealth Games
Medallists at the 1978 Commonwealth Games